Kevin R. Hayden (born c. 1968) is an American lawyer currently serving as District Attorney for Suffolk County, Massachusetts, after being appointed by Governor Charlie Baker. Hayden was elected District Attorney in 2022 after winning the Democratic primary and running unopposed in the general election.

Early life and education

Hayden grew up in Newton, Massachusetts, and spent time in the Roxbury neighborhood of Boston when his father moved there following his parents’ divorce. Hayden played high school lacrosse at Noble and Greenough School and went to Dartmouth College where he majored in English. He worked in finance before going to law school at Boston University.

Career
Hayden served as an assistant district attorney in the Suffolk County District Attorney's office from 1997 to 2008. In 2015, Governor of Massachusetts Charlie Baker appointed Hayden as chairman of the Massachusetts Sex Offender Registry board.

Suffolk County District Attorney
In January 2022, Governor Baker appointed Hayden to replace Rachael Rollins as Suffolk County District Attorney when Rollins became U.S. Attorney for Massachusetts. As interim district attorney, Hayden increased the number of prosecutors assigned to the civil rights and hate crime unit due to an increase in high-visibility white-supremacist activity in the Boston area.

2022 Primary Election
When appointed, it was unclear if Hayden planned to seek a full term in the position. He subsequently declared his candidacy in February 2022 as a Democratic candidate, running against Boston City Council member Ricardo Arroyo. Hayden describes himself as a liberal prosecutor though during the election he was typically cast as more centrist than Arroyo. Hayden received endorsements from elected officials including State Senator Will Brownsberger and Boston City Councilors Frank Baker and Erin Murphy.

The campaign was marked by controversy, especially after The Boston Globe received records of two investigations of Arroyo for committing sexual assault when he was teenager. Arroyo denied even knowing the investigations were opened and accused Hayden of using the power of his office to release the records which Hayden denied. Preempting critique from Arroyo, the District Attorney's office released a statement noting that though Arroyo was not charged with a crime that the allegations may still have been true.  A Boston City Council debate about removing Arroyo from chairing the Government Operations and Redistricting committees was characterized as being between those aligned behind Hayden and those aligned behind Arroyo. Following the debate, during a council recess an Arroyo supporter was assaulted in Boston City Hall by a Hayden supporter.

Following the Democratic primary election held on September 6, and with results showing Hayden with a lead of approximately seven points (53.8% to 46.2%), Arroyo conceded the race via Twitter the following morning.

Controversies
During his tenure as chair, a state audit of the MA Sex Offender Registry Board determined that 1,769 people on the registry had not kept up with reporting requirements and 936 were not properly categorized.

Hayden was accused of corruption and covering up police misconduct after being appointed Suffolk County DA. In April 2021, Transit Police officer Jacob Green threatened motorist Jason Lenor with a gun while off duty and not in uniform. Green proceeded to cover up the incident with support from colleague Kevin Davis. Investigation of the harassment began under District Attorney Rollins but was not yet concluded by the time Hayden was appointed to the role. Despite strong evidence of misconduct, Hayden's assistant DA Kevin Mullen indicated to attorneys for both Green and Davis that they would not be proceeding to prosecute the case. Following Mullen's first indication the case would not proceed, Green's lawyer Robert Griffin made a donation of $100 to Hayden's election campaign and Green himself made a donation of $125. Griffin claims Hayden personally called him to solicit a donation. Hayden's office declined to comment on the investigation. Following the story, Hayden faced calls to resign from Boston politicians and apparent criticism via the Twitter account of the Transit Police. U.S. Attorney Rollins' office was recused from any potential investigations into these allegations. Later in 2022 Hayden's office dropped charges against another former Transit Police officer accused of covering up the beating an unhoused man in 2018 after asserted new evidence changed the nature of the case despite Transit Police expressing disappointment at the decision to not prosecute.

Electoral History

References 

Living people
1960s births
Date of birth missing (living people)
Massachusetts lawyers
District attorneys in Suffolk County, Massachusetts
People from Newton, Massachusetts
Noble and Greenough School alumni
Dartmouth College alumni
Boston University School of Law alumni